This article shows the roster of all participating teams at the 2021 FIVB Volleyball Women's Nations League.

The following is the Belgium roster in the 2021 Women's Nations League.

Head coach:  Gert Vande Broek

2 Elise Van Sas 
3 Britt Herbots 
4 Nathalie Lemmens 
5 Jodie Guilliams 
6 Helena Gilson 
7 Celine Van Gestel 
8 Kaja Grobelna 
9 Nel Demeyer 
10 Dominika Sobolska 
12 Charlotte Krenicky 
13 Marlies Janssens 
14 Lise De Valkeneer 
15 Jutta Van De Vyver 
17 Ilka Van de Vyver 
18 Britt Rampelberg 
19 Silke Van Avermaet 
21 Manon Stragier

The following is the Brazil roster in the 2021 Women's Nations League.

Head coach:  José Roberto Guimarães

2 Carol Gattaz 
3 Dani Lins 
5 Adenízia da Silva 
6 Nyeme Costa 
7 Rosamaria Montibeller 
8 Macris Carneiro 
9 Roberta Ratzke 
10 Gabriela Guimarães 
11 Tandara Caixeta 
12 Natália Pereira 
13 Sheilla Castro 
15 Ana Carolina da Silva 
16 Fernanda Garay 
17 Ana Cristina de Souza 
18 Camila Brait 
20 Ana Beatriz Corrêa 
24 Lorenne Teixeira 
28 Mayany de Souza

The following is the Canada roster in the 2021 Women's Nations League.

Head coach:  Shannon Winzer

1 Cassandra Bujan 
3 Kiera Van Ryk 
5 Danielle Smith 
6 Jazmine Ruth White 
7 Layne Van Buskirk 
8 Alicia Ogoms 
9 Alexa Gray 
11 Andrea Mitrović 
12 Jennifer Cross 
13 Brie King 
14 Hilary Howe 
15 Shainah Joseph 
16 Caroline Livingston 
18 Kim Robitaille 
19 Emily Maglio 
22 Kennedy Snape 
23 Parker Austin

The following is the China roster in the 2021 Women's Nations League.

Head coach:  Lang Ping

1 Yuan Xinyue 
2 Zhu Ting 
3 Diao Linyu 
4 Yang Hanyu 
5 Gao Yi 
6 Gong Xiangyu 
7 Wang Yuanyuan 
8 Li Yao 
9 Zhang Changning 
10 Liu Xiaotong 
11 Yao Di 
12 Li Yingying 
14 Zheng Yixin 
15 Lin Li 
16 Ding Xia 
17 Yan Ni 
18 Wang Mengjie 
19 Liu Yanhan 
22 Duan Fang

The following is the Dominican Republic roster in the 2021 Women's Nations League.

Head coach:  Marcos Kwiek

1 Annerys Vargas 
3 Lisvel Elisa Eve 
5 Brenda Castillo 
6 Camil Domínguez 
7 Niverka Marte 
11 Marifranchi Rodríguez 
12 Yokaty Pérez 
14 Prisilla Rivera 
16 Yonkaira Peña 
17 Gina Mambrú 
18 Bethania de la Cruz 
20 Brayelin Martínez 
21 Jineiry Martínez 
23 Gaila González 
25 Larysmer Martínez Caro

The following is the Germany roster in the 2021 Women's Nations League.

Head coach:  Felix Koslowski

1 Linda Bock 
2 Pia Kästner 
4 Denise Imoudu 
5 Jana Franziska Poll 
6 Jennifer Janiska 
7 Ivana Vanjak 
8 Kimberly Drewniok 
9 Lina Alsmeier 
10 Lena Stigrot 
12 Hanna Orthmann 
14 Marie Schölzel 
16 Lea Ambrosius 
17 Anna Pogany 
18 Magdalena Gryka 
20 Josepha Bock 
21 Camilla Weitzel 
24 Anastasia Cekulaev

The following is the Italy roster in the 2021 Women's Nations League.

Head coach:  Giulio Cesare Bregoli

2 Francesca Bosio 
4 Sara Bonifacio 
12 Anastasia Guerra 
15 Sylvia Chinelo Nwakalor 
19 Camilla Mingardi 
21 Marina Lubian 
23 Chiara De Bortoli 
24 Alessia Mazzaro 
26 Ilaria Battistoni 
27 Eleonora Furlan 
28 Giulia Melli 
29 Sofia D'odorico 
30 Federica Squarcini 
31 Eleonora Fersino 
32 Loveth Omoruyi

The following is the Japan roster in the 2021 Women's Nations League.

Head coach:  Kumi Nakada

1 Ai Kurogo 
2 Sarina Koga 
3 Haruyo Shimamura 
4 Miyu Nagaoka 
5 Erika Araki 
7 Yuki Ishii 
8 Mayu Ishikawa 
9 Kanami Tashiro 
10 Aika Akutagawa 
11 Yurie Nabeya 
13 Mai Okumura 
14 Mako Kobata 
15 Kotoe Inoue 
19 Nichika Yamada 
20 Nanami Seki 
21 Kotona Hayashi 
24 Aki Momii

The following is the South Korea roster in the 2021 Women's Nations League.

Head coach:  Stefano Lavarini

1 Lee So-young 
2 Lee Da-hyeon 
3 Yeum Hye-seon 
5 Han Da-hye 
6 Kim Da-in 
7 Ahn Hye-jin 
8 Park Eun-jin 
9 Oh Ji-young 
10 Kim Yeon-koung 
12 Han Song-yi 
13 Park Jeong-ah 
14 Yang Hyo-jin 
15 Yuk Seo-young 
16 Jeong Ji-yun 
19 Pyo Seung-ju

The following is the Netherlands roster in the 2021 Women's Nations League.

Head coach:  Avital Selinger

1 Kirsten Knip 
2 Fleur Savelkoel 
4 Celeste Plak 
7 Juliët Lohuis 
8 Demi Korevaar 
9 Myrthe Schoot 
10 Sarah Van Aalen 
11 Anne Buijs 
12 Britt Bongaerts 
13 Hester Jasper 
16 Indy Baijens 
18 Marrit Jasper 
19 Nika Daalderop 
21 Annick Meijers 
23 Eline Timmerman 
24 Laura de Zwart 
26 Elles Dambrink 
27 Iris Scholten

The following is the Poland roster in the 2021 Women's Nations League.

Head coach:  Jacek Nawrocki

1 Julia Nowicka 
3 Klaudia Alagierska 
5 Agnieszka Kąkolewska 
8 Maria Stenzel 
9 Magdalena Stysiak 
10 Zuzanna Efimienko 
11 Martyna Łukasik 
13 Monika Jagla 
17 Malwina Smarzek 
19 Monika Fedusio 
20 Martyna Czyrniańska 
21 Karolina Drużkowska 
23 Marta Krajewska 
27 Martyna Łazowska 
30 Olivia Różański 
78 Aleksandra Gryka 
88 Zuzanna Górecka

The following is the Russia roster in the 2021 Women's Nations League.

Head coach:  Sergio Busato

2 Daria Malygina 
4 Daria Pilipenko 
5 Arina Fedorovtseva 
6 Irina Koroleva 
8 Nataliya Goncharova 
9 Valeriia Gorbunova 
10 Polina Matveeva 
11 Yulia Brovkina 
12 Anna Lazareva 
13 Yevgeniya Startseva 
14 Irina Fetisova 
15 Tatiana Kosheleva 
16 Irina Voronkova 
20 Ekaterina Lazareva 
22 Tamara Zaytseva 
23 Irina Kapustina 
24 Ekaterina Pipunyrova 
25 Kseniia Smirnova

The following is the Serbia roster in the 2021 Women's Nations League.

Head coach:  Aleksandar Vladisavljev

2 Katarina Lazović 
3 Sara Carić 
6 Aleksandra Uzelac 
7 Ana Jakšić 
21 Jovana Kocić 
22 Sara Lozo 
23 Mila Đorđević 
24 Sofija Medić 
25 Božica Marković 
26 Vanja Savić 
27 Vanja Bukilić 
28 Jelena Delić 
31 Sanja Djurdjević 
32 Bojana Gočanin 
33 Jovana Cvetković 
34 Jovana Mirosavljević

The following is the Thailand roster in the 2021 Women's Nations League.

Head coach:  Kittikun Sriutthawong

2 Piyanut Pannoy 
3 Sirima Manakij 
5 Pleumjit Thinkaow 
6 Onuma Sittirak 
8 Tirawan Sang-Ob 
9 Sutadta Chuewulim 
10 Wilavan Apinyapong 
11 Amporn Hyapha 
12 Tapaphaipun Chaisri 
13 Nootsara Tomkom 
14 Pattiya Juangjan 
15 Malika Kanthong 
17 Gullapa Piampongsan 
19 Karina Krause 
20 Soraya Phomla 
22 Chatsuda Nilapa 
24 Watchareeya Nuanjam

The following is the Turkey roster in the 2021 Women's Nations League.

Head coach:  Giovanni Guidetti

2 Simge Şebnem Aköz 
3 Cansu Özbay 
4 Tuğba Şenoğlu 
5 Şeyma Ercan 
6 Kübra Akman 
7 Hande Baladın 
8 Yasemin Güveli 
9 Meliha İsmailoğlu 
10 Ayça Aykaç 
11 Naz Aydemir 
13 Meryem Boz 
14 Eda Erdem Dündar 
18 Zehra Güneş 
19 Aslı Kalaç 
99 Ebrar Karakurt

The following is the United States roster in the 2021 Women's Nations League.

Head coach:  Karch Kiraly

1 Micha Hancock 
2 Jordyn Poulter 
3 Kathryn Plummer 
4 Justine Wong-Orantes 
6 TeTori Dixon 
7 Lauren Carlini 
8 Hannah Tapp 
10 Jordan Larson 
11 Andrea Drews 
12 Jordan Thompson 
13 Sarah Wilhite 
14 Michelle Bartsch-Hackley 
15 Kimberly Hill 
16 Foluke Akinradewo 
17 Megan Courtney 
22 Haleigh Washington 
23 Kelsey Robinson 
24 Chiaka Ogbogu

References

External links
Official website

2021 squads
FIVB Volleyball Women's Nations League squads